Antisemitica designates, in the fields of book collecting, and rare book dealing, the collection and distribution of books, pamphlets, serials, posters, and other printed literature, of an antisemitic nature. Antisemitica does not, generally, designate antisemitic activity, or antisemites themselves. In the United States, the freedom of the press does not limit the publication or distribution of antisemitic literature, and there are scholarly and historical interests in such material.

See also 
Bibliophilia

References

External links 
A catalog of antisemitica at Dan Wyman Books
Antisemitic Literature Collection held at the American Jewish Historical Society, New York, NY

 
Books by type
Book collecting